The Akshayapureeswarar Temple at Vilankulam in the Indian state of Tamil Nadu is a Hindu temple dedicated to Shiva and an art of the work achieved by Cholas in Tamil architecture
Built in 1335 AD to 1365 AD by Parakrama Pandyan in Vilankulam, it turned 700 years old.

History 
The place is closely associated with Planet Saturn.  His brother, Yama the God of Death hit Him on His leg and was lamed.  Saturn began a pilgrimage to all Shiva temples for remedy.  When He came here, he fell down struck by the roots of Vila tree.  It was a Saturday (Sani's own day) combined with Poosam star and Akshaya Thrithiya indicating prosperity.  As He fell, the spring Poosa Gnanavavi, hidden till then, rose with force and took Him up.  Lord Akshaya Pureeswara granted darshan to Him and blessed Sani with wedding. His leg became straight.

Combined with the names of Vila tree and the Gnanavari spring, the place came to be known as Vilankulam.  Kulam-spring.  A Siddha, Poosa Marungar by name, living in Saneeswara Loka (world), used to spill the Sanivari theertha on the springs of Shiva temples.  Saneeswara has importance in such temples.  The Siddha has a rare power of visiting the world of Sun and the world of the Pithrus (departed ancestors) and is the Guru of the crows.  It is believed that the Siddha is visiting the temple for worship daily.

Temple's speciality 

Sani Baghwan (planet Saturn) graces in the temple facing south with His consorts Mandha and Jeshta in wedding form.

Main temple 
A first rectangular surrounding wall, marks the outer boundary.
The main temple is in the center of the spacious quadrangle composed of a sanctuary, a Nandi, a pillared hall and an assembly hall (mandapas), and many sub-shrines. The most important part of the temple is the inner mandapa which is surrounded by massive walls that are divided into levels by sharply cut sculptures and pilasters providing deep bays and recesses. Each side of the sanctuary has a bay emphasising the principle cult icons. The karuvarai, a Tamil word meaning the interior of the sanctum sanctorum, is the inner most sanctum and focus of the temple where an image of the primary deity, Shiva, resides. Inside is a huge stone linga. The word Karuvarai means "womb chamber" from Tamil word karu for foetus. Only priests are allowed to enter this inner-most chamber.

Characteristics 

The legend goes that Poosa Padan brings friendship.  Padan denotes Saturn.  When his leg was affected, Saturn worshipped Akshaya Purreswarar in the temple.  This star is eighth in the list of 27 stars.  Hence, they are advised to pray here on the star day or on the Akshaya Tthritiya day falling in the month of April–May for gaining all prosperity and health in life.  They should also perform abishek to Sani Bhagwan with eight items as mentioned above (prayer commitment) and circumambulate the shrine eight times for lasting solutions for their problems.  Even if the impact of Sani aspect would be severe, this prayer would help reduce the intensity of adverse look of the planet.

Vilankulam Saneeswara is sought by those facing debt burdens, distressed, frequent health problems, the handicapped and facing obstacles in marriage proposals.  He is gracing in the temple with His consorts Jeshta and Mandha in wedding form in the name of Aadhibruhat Saneeswara.  He is all merciful in the temple.  Mother Abhivruddhi Nayaki (mother granting all progress in life) ensures all development in life.   There is no Navagraha shrine (shrine for 9 planets together) in the temple.  Instead, Sani Baghwan and His Father Sun grace from their respective shrines.  Lord Vinayaka graces facing west.   As He ensures success (Vijaya) to His devotees, He is praised as Vijaya Vinayaka.

Temple deities 

The "moolavar" or prime deity of the Akshayapureeswarar Temple is Shiva. All deities, particularly those placed in the niches of the outer wall (Koshta Moorthigal) like Dakshinamurthy. There are shrines for Lord Vinayaka, Lord Muruga with Valli and Deivanai, Chandikeswara, Saneeswara with consorts, Sun, Bhairava, Nandhi, Lord Dakshinamurthy, Brahmma, Lingodhbava, Mother Durga, Mother Gajalakshmi, Nagar and Lord Nataraja.

Prayer 
Besides those belonging to Poosam star praying for removal of planetary afflictions, those handicapped and those suffering from leg pain and those facing obstacles in wedding proposals throng the temple for remedy.

Thanksgiving 
Poosam starrers are advised to perform abishek to Sani Bhagwan (planet Saturn) with eight objects as oil, panchamirtham, punugu a cosmetic paste, green coconut, milk, curd etc. They also have to circumambulate the shrine eight times.

Gallery

References

External links 

Shiva temples in Thanjavur district
1335 establishments in Asia
14th-century establishments in India
Chola architecture